Chocolate spread is a sweet chocolate-flavored paste which is eaten mostly spread on breads and toasts or similar grain items such as waffles, pancakes, muffins, and pitas.

Although it tastes, smells, and looks like chocolate, it does not solidify, even at room temperature. The paste usually contains cocoa and vegetable or palm oil, and is also likely to contain milk, sugar and additional flavors. Some varieties include nuts (e.g., ground hazelnuts) or honey. Chocolate spread is normally sold in glass jars or plastic tubs.

Notable brands
Nutella – Italian
Nudossi – German
Nugatti – Norwegian
Nocilla – Spanish
Eurocrem – Serbian
Toastaria – Thailand

Nutritional information

See also

 List of spreads
 Hazelnut butter

References

Further reading

External links
 

Chocolate
Spreads (food)